is a private women's college in Shinjuku, Tokyo, Japan; part of the Gakushūin School Corporation (学習院). The predecessor of the school was founded in 1847 by Emperor Kōmei. It was chartered as a junior college in 1949 and became a four-year college in 1998.

Gakushuin Women's College is also one of the main hosts of the International Theater Company London which comes from London to perform Shakespearean plays in English, directed by MBE Paul Stebbings and brought to Japan by Paula Berwanger. Past performances include A Midsummer Night's Dream, Romeo and Juliet and Twelfth Night.
The 2020 performance of Othello was cancelled due to COVID-19.

References

External links

 Official website

Educational institutions established in 1847
Private universities and colleges in Japan
Universities and colleges in Tokyo
Buildings and structures in Shinjuku
Buildings and structures in Japan destroyed during World War II
Important Cultural Properties of Japan
1847 establishments in Japan
Women's universities and colleges in Japan